Abdul Rahman Infant IPS (A.R. Infant IPS) (born June 23, 1952), was the former director general and inspector general of police (DGP & IG) in the state of Karnataka, India. His appointment was announced by the Karnataka state home minister R. Ashoka on 31 of March 2012 following a state high court order directing the removal of its current DGP & IG Shankar Bidari and replacing the DGP & IG position with  Infant. However Shankar Bidri was later given clean chit by  Supreme Court of India clearing him of all baseless allegations. He hails from Kerala. He was born in Paravoor in Kollam district.

References 

Indian Police Service officers
1952 births
Living people
Karnataka Police